The Men's African Qualifiers saw three teams qualify for the 1964 Summer Olympics football tournament.

Group 1

First round 

|}

United Arab Republic advance.

Rhodesia withdrew, Sudan advance.

Second round 

|}

United Arab Republic qualified for the 1964 Summer Olympics.

Group 2

First round 

|}

Ghana advance.

Tunisia qualified on a coin toss.

Second round 

|}

Ghana qualified for the 1964 Summer Olympics.

Group 3

First round

|}

Ethiopia advance.

Morocco advance.

Second round 

|}

Morocco qualified for the 1964 Summer Olympics.

References 

Africa
1964